Muharem Bajrami (born 29 November 1985) is an Albanian retired footballer from the present-day North Macedonia.

Club career
He started his playing career in FK Sloga Jugomagnat, but after the relegation of Sloga Jugomagnat, Muharem Bajrami joined the new team in the first Macedonian league Vëllazërimi along with his teammate Minas Osmani who was in Vëllazërimi on loan from FK Vardar.
Muharem Bajrami had an excellent half-season in FK Vëllazërimi, in which he scored 15 goals and was named man of the match 11 times. He was a leader in both the top scorers table and in the MVP table. These statistics led to Bajrami being watched by several teams, but FBK Kaunas eventually signed him on a five-year contract.

International career
Bajrami was also a member of the Republic of Macedonia U-21 squad. He also has a younger brother Idai Bajrami (07.11.1986) who is currently playing for FK Sloga Jugomagnat and has been capped in the Republic of Macedonian U-17 squad.

References

External links
 MacedonianFootball.com 
 Football Federation of Macedonia Website 

1985 births
Living people
Footballers from Skopje
Albanian footballers from North Macedonia
Association football midfielders
Macedonian footballers
North Macedonia international footballers
FK Sloga Jugomagnat players
FK Vëllazërimi 77 players
FBK Kaunas footballers
FK Šilutė players
FK Renova players
FC Gomel players
KF Shkëndija players
FK Shkupi players
Macedonian First Football League players
Macedonian expatriate footballers
Expatriate footballers in Lithuania
Macedonian expatriate sportspeople in Lithuania
Expatriate footballers in Belarus
Macedonian expatriate sportspeople in Belarus
North Macedonia youth international footballers
North Macedonia under-21 international footballers
Macedonian football managers
FK Makedonija Gjorče Petrov managers